The 1939 Wichita Shockers football team was an American football team that represented Wichita University (now known as Wichita State University) in the Central Intercollegiate Conference during the 1939 college football season. In their 10th season under head coach Al Gebert, the Shockers compiled a 5–3–2 record (4–0–1 against conference opponents), won the CIC championship, and outscored opponents by a total of 111 to 68.

Schedule

References

Wichita
Wichita State Shockers football seasons
Wichita Shockers football